Mittelndorf is a railway station in the village of Mittelndorf, Saxony, Germany. The station lies on the Bautzen–Bad Schandau railway. The station is served by one train service, operated by DB Regio in cooperation with České dráhy: the National Park Railway. This service connects Děčín and Rumburk via Bad Schandau and Sebnitz.

Overview
The station counts a single platform and is situated in the forest close to the village. Mittelndorf station has a rare peculiarity for a train station situated on a normal national rail line: it has not a road to reach it but a simple forest trial. A similar thing in Europe could be found, for example, in the stations of Kloster Marienthal (Engers-Au line, Germany); Pertosa, in southern Italy; or Corrour, in Scotland.

References

Deutsche Bahn website
Städtebahn Sachsen website

External links
Network map

Railway stations in Saxony
Sebnitz
Railway stations in Germany opened in 1904